John Frederick Maitland (born February 8, 1948) is a former American football running back in the National Football League (NFL) in the 1970s and earned a Super Bowl ring.  He attended Upper St. Clair High School near Pittsburgh, then Williams College.  His pro-career was spent with both the Baltimore Colts and the New England Patriots.  He played in and won Super Bowl V with the Colts.

References

1948 births
Living people
American football running backs
Baltimore Colts players
New England Patriots players
Williams Ephs football players
Players of American football from Pittsburgh